Westminster was a parliamentary constituency in the Parliament of England to 1707, the Parliament of Great Britain 1707–1800 and the Parliament of the United Kingdom from 1801. It returned two members to 1885 and one thereafter.

The constituency was first known to have been represented in Parliament in 1545 and continued to exist until the redistribution of seats in 1918. The constituency's most famous former representatives are John Stuart Mill and Charles James Fox.  The most analogous contemporary constituency is Cities of London and Westminster.

Boundaries and boundary changes
1885-1918: The Westminster district, and Close of Collegiate Church of St. Peter.

The constituency was formed in 1545 from part of the county constituency of Middlesex and returned two members of parliament until 1885.

The City of Westminster is a district of Inner London. Its southern boundary is on the north bank of the River Thames. It is today combined with Marylebone to the north.  It is west of the diminutive City of London, fixed with four MPs in 1298, and the north part of Lambeth, created a broad constituency in 1832. It is south-west of Holborn and St. Pancras which in 1832 were both placed in a wider seat named Finsbury and to the east of Kensington and Chelsea which were dealt with similarly in a seat named Chelsea.

In the 1885 redistribution of seats the constituency (virtually identical to the Metropolitan Borough of Westminster which was created in 1900) was divided into three single-member seats. The south-eastern part, including the traditional heart of Westminster and such important centres of power as the Houses of Parliament and the seat of government in Whitehall, continued to be a constituency called Westminster. By official definition the areas retained were "the Westminster district and Close of the Collegiate Church of St Peter"; a seat named Strand was created in the north-east and a seat, St George's, Hanover Square, in the west.

In the 1918 redistribution the three seats were cut to two: Westminster St George's in the west and Westminster Abbey in the east, the latter wholly containing and slightly larger than the 1885–1918 Westminster seat (except for its Knightsbridge exclave which lay some way off in the west).

History
The Westminster constituency represented the centre of British government and had a large electorate so that it was independent of the control of a patron. Before the Reform Act 1832 the right to vote was held by the male inhabitants paying scot and lot (a kind of local property tax). The franchise was the largest of any borough in the kingdom, and only the county constituency of Yorkshire had more voters. Sedgwick estimated the electorate at about 8,000 in the first half of the eighteenth century. Namier and Brooke estimated that there were about 12,000 voters later in the century. The large size of the electorate made contested elections immensely expensive.

In the sixteenth century the Church officials associated with Westminster Abbey had a large influence in the area, but as the community became bigger that became less important. The Court (or His Majesty's Treasury) had some legitimate influence (by the standards of the age), because of the royal residences and government offices in the borough. The use of public funds to bribe the electorate was not unknown, during close elections (see the comments about the cost of the 1780 and 1784 contests below). Local landowners who were prepared to stir up ill-will by threatening to evict or raise the rents of tenants voting the wrong way, could also affect the result.

Unlawful means were sometimes used to make sure that the right candidates were elected. In 1722 the election of two Tories was declared void because of rioting which prevented some Whigs voting. In 1741 a Whig returning officer called upon the assistance of some troops to close the poll before the Tory candidates could catch up to the Whig votes.

The House of Commons declared the 1741 election void with the ringing resolution that "the presence of a regular body of armed soldiers at an election of members to sit in Parliament, is a high infringement of the liberties of the subject, a manifest violation of the freedom of election and an open defiance of the laws and constitution of this kingdom".

By the eighteenth century it was normal for the members to be Irish peers, the sons of peers or baronets, as it was thought appropriate for them to be of high social standing so as to be worthy to represent the seat.

The Treasury spent the enormous sums of more than £8,000 in 1780 and £9,000 in 1784, in unsuccessful attempts to defeat the opposition Whig leader Charles James Fox. So expensive were these contests that for the next general election in 1790, the government and opposition leaders reached a formal agreement for each to have one member returned unopposed. However, in the event a second Whig candidate did appear, but the Tory (the famous Admiral Lord Hood) and Fox were re-elected without too much difficulty.

The last MP for this constituency, William Burdett-Coutts, was connected with a family prominent in City of Westminster politics since the eighteenth century. He himself was born in the United States in 1851, his grandparents on both sides having been British subjects. After he married Baroness Burdett-Coutts in 1881 he changed his surname from Bartlett to Burdett-Coutts. He represented the area from 1885 until 1918 and continued to sit for the Abbey division until his death in 1921.

Lists of Members of Parliament
The English civil year started on 25 March until 1752 (Scotland having changed to 1 January in 1600). The years used in this article have been converted to the new style where necessary. Old style dates would be a year earlier than the new style for days between 1 January and 24 March. No attempt has been made to compensate for the eleven days which did not occur in September 1752 in both England and Scotland as well as other British controlled territories (when the day after 2 September was 14 September), so as to bring the British Empire fully in line with the Gregorian calendar.

Members of Parliament 1545–1660
Some of the members elected during this period have been identified. The year first given is for the initial meeting of the Parliament, with the month added where there was more than one Parliament in the year. If a second year is given this is a date of dissolution. Early Parliaments sometimes only existed for a few days or weeks, so dissolutions in the same year as the first meeting are not recorded in this list If a specific date of election is known this is recorded in italic brackets. The Roman numerals in brackets, following some names, are those used to distinguish different politicians of the same name in 'The House of Commons' 1509–1558 and 1558–1603.

Members of Parliament 1660–1918

Fictional Member of Parliament

Westminster was the constituency of fraudulent businessman Augustus Melmotte, who gained election as a Conservative, in Anthony Trollope's satirical novel, The Way We Live Now (published 1875).

Elections

General notes
In multi-member elections the bloc voting system was used. Voters could cast a vote for one or two candidates, as they chose. The leading candidates with the largest number of votes were elected.

In by-elections and all elections after 1885, to fill a single seat, the first past the post system applied.

After 1832, when registration of voters was introduced, a turnout figure is given for contested elections. In two-member elections, when the exact number of participating voters is unknown, this is calculated by dividing the number of votes by two. To the extent that electors did not use both their votes this will be an underestimate of turnout.

Where a party had more than one candidate in one or both of a pair of successive elections change is calculated for each individual candidate, otherwise change is based on the party vote. Change figures at by-elections are from the preceding general election or the last intervening by-election.  Change figures at general elections are from the last general election.

Candidates for whom no party has been identified are classified as Non Partisan. The candidate might have been associated with a party or faction in Parliament or consider himself to belong to a particular political tradition. Political parties before the nineteenth century were not as cohesive or organised as they later became. Contemporary commentators (even the reputed leaders of parties or factions) in the eighteenth century did not necessarily agree who the party supporters were. The traditional parties, which had arisen in the late seventeenth century, became increasingly irrelevant to politics in the eighteenth century (particularly after 1760), although for some contests in some constituencies party labels were still used. It was only towards the end of the century that party labels began to acquire some meaning again, although this process was by no means complete for several more generations.

Sources: The results for elections before 1790 were taken from the History of Parliament Trust publications on the House of Commons. The results from 1790 until the 1832 general election are based on Stooks Smith and from 1832 onwards on Craig. Where Stooks Smith gives additional information to the other sources this is indicated in a note.

Dates of Westminster general and by-elections 1660–1918

Notes:
(1) Election declared void
(2) Date of expulsion from the House of Lord Cochrane

Election results (Parliament of England) 1660–1690

 Note (1661): Vote totals unavailable

 Note (February 1679): Vote totals unavailable

 Note (September 1679): Vote totals unavailable
 On petition Wythens was unseated and William Waller seated on 15 November 1680

 Note (1681): Vote totals unavailable

 Note (1685): Vote totals unavailable. The candidate in this election is not the Gilbert Gerard elected in 1660, nor is he the Gilbert Gerard who was knight of the shire for Middlesex earlier in the century.

 Note (1689): Vote totals unavailable. Matthews and Dewey are described by Henning as radical candidates, but should not be confused with the followers of John Wilkes in the late eighteenth century or the radicals of the nineteenth century.

Election results (Parliament of Great Britain) 1715–1800

 Robert Molesworth (W) was proposed but withdrew before the poll.
 Election declared void 6 November 1722.

 Clayton created an Irish peer as 1st Baron Sundon 2 June 1735

 Election declared void 22 December 1741.

 Trentham appointed a Lord of the Admiralty

 After a scrutiny the member returned was unchanged and vote totals were amended to Trentham 4,103; Vandeput 3,933.
 Death of Warren 29 July 1752

 Cornwallis appointed Governor of Gibraltar

 Death of Pulteney 11 February 1763

 Lord Warkworth became known by the courtesy title of Earl Percy from 1766, when his father was advanced in the peerage from Earl to Duke of Northumberland

 Succession of Sandys as 2nd Baron Sandys 21 April 1770

 Succession of Percy to his mother's title, as 3rd Baron Percy on 5 December 1776

 Succession of Petersham as 3rd Earl of Harrington 1 April 1779

 Pelham-Clinton was known by the courtesy title of Earl of Lincoln, following the death of his brother in 1779

 Note: (1780): Poll 21 days; 9,136 voted; party labels. (Source: Stooks Smith)
 Appointment of Fox as Secretary of State for Foreign Affairs 27 March 1782 Creation of Rodney as 1st Baron Rodney 19 June 1782 Appointment of Fox as Secretary of State for Foreign Affairs 2 April 1783 Note (1784): Poll 40 days; 12,301 voted. After a scrutiny the members returned were unchanged and vote totals were amended to the figures as above. Original votes Hood 6,694; Fox 6,234; Wray 5,998. (Source: Stooks Smith) Hood and Fox were declared elected 4 March 1785 Appointment of Hood as a Commissioner of the Admiralty 16 July 1788 Note (1788): Poll 15 days. (Source: Stooks Smith) Note (1790): Poll 15 days. Mr Tooke proposed himself. (Source: Stooks Smith) Expulsion of Fox from the Privy Council 9 May 1798 Creation of Gardner as an Irish peer, 1st Baron Gardner 29 December 1800Election results (Parliament of the United Kingdom)

 Note (1802): Poll 9 days. (Source: Stooks Smith) Appointment of Fox as Secretary of State for Foreign Affairs 7 February 1806 Death of Fox 13 September 1806Note (1806): Poll 15 days; 10,277 voted. (Source: Stooks Smith)Note (1807): Poll 15 days; 8,622 voted. (Source: Stooks Smith) Expulsion of Cochrane from the House of Commons, after being convicted of conspiracy, 5 July 1814 Note (1818): Poll 15 days; 10,277 voted. (Source: Stooks Smith) Death of Romilly 2 November 1818 Note (1819): Poll 15 days. (Source: Stooks Smith) Note (1820): Poll 15 days; 9,280 voted. (Source: Stooks Smith) Appointment of Hobhouse as Secretary at War Appointment of Hobhouse as Chief Secretary for Ireland Resignation of Hobhouse, by accepting the office of Steward of the Chiltern Hundreds, after he left the Ministry in opposition to the House and Window taxes. Resignation of Burdett to seek re-election on changing parties. 

 

 Appointment of Rous as a Lord Commissioner of the Admiralty Note (1847): 14,125 registered (Craig's figure above used for the turnout calculation); 7,185 voted. Evans was classified as a Radical, Lushington and Cochrane as Whigs and Rous as a Tory. (Source: Stooks Smith) 

 

 William Henry Smith described himself as a 'Liberal-Conservative' in support of  Liberal prime minister Lord Palmerston. 

 

 Appointment of Smith as First Lord of the Admiralty 

 Resignation of Russell Appointment of Smith as Secretary of State for War Constituency reduced to one seat and boundaries changed in the redistribution of 1885Election results 1885–1918

Elections in the 1880s

Elections in the 1890s

Elections in the 1900s

Elections in the 1910s

See also
 List of parliamentary constituencies in London
 Duration of English, British and United Kingdom parliaments from 1660

References

Bibliography
 Boundaries of Parliamentary Constituencies 1885–1972, compiled and edited by F.W.S. Craig (Political Reference Publications 1972)
 British Parliamentary Election Results 1832–1885, compiled and edited by F.W.S. Craig (The Macmillan Press 1977)
 British Parliamentary Election Results 1885–1918, compiled and edited by F.W.S. Craig (The Macmillan Press 1974)
 The House of Commons 1509–1558, by S.T. Bindoff (Secker & Warburg 1982)
 The House of Commons 1558–1603, by P.W. Hasler (HMSO 1981)
 The House of Commons 1660–1690, by Basil Duke Henning (Secker & Warburg 1983)
 The House of Commons 1715–1754, by Romney Sedgwick (HMSO 1970)
 The House of Commons 1754–1790, by Sir Lewis Namier and John Brooke (HMSO 1964)
 The House of Commons 1790–1820, by R.G. Thorne (Secker & Warburg 1986)
 The Parliaments of England by Henry Stooks Smith (1st edition published in three volumes 1844–50), second edition edited (in one volume) by F.W.S. Craig (Political Reference Publications 1973)
 Who's Who of British Members of Parliament: Volume I 1832–1885'', edited by M. Stenton (The Harvester Press 1976)

Politics of the City of Westminster
Parliamentary constituencies in London (historic)
Constituencies of the Parliament of the United Kingdom established in 1545
Constituencies of the Parliament of the United Kingdom disestablished in 1918
Political history of Middlesex